EnergieVerbund Arena (formerly known as Freiberger Arena) is an arena in Dresden, Germany.  It is primarily used for the ice hockey club Dresdner Eislöwen.

Indoor arenas in Germany
Indoor ice hockey venues in Germany
Sport in Dresden
Buildings and structures in Dresden
Sports venues in Saxony